The Royal Hotel in Perth, Western Australia is a hotel building from 1882 that has survived over one hundred years, on the corner of Wellington and William streets.

An early name was the Schruth's Royal Hotel in 1894.

A major upgrading of the facade was done in 1906.

It was bought by the Swan Brewery in 1925.

The hotel building remains despite extensive changes around it throughout the twentieth century. Following extensive renovations, The Royal, a pub occupying the building, opened on 16 November 2019.

References

Historic hotels in Perth, Western Australia
Raine Square
1882 establishments in Australia
Pubs in Perth, Western Australia
State Register of Heritage Places in the City of Perth